The Malabadi Bridge is an  long, two lane, deck-arch bridge that crosses the Batman river near Çatakköprü, Diyarbakır Province. The bridge carries the old D.360 state road, as the current highway crosses a newer bridge just south of the two older bridges.

Construction of the bridge started in December 1954 and was completed in March 1955, just three and a half months later. With the opening of the bridge, it replaced the historic pointed-arch bridge adjacent to it.

References

Buildings and structures in Diyarbakır Province
Road bridges in Turkey
Bridges completed in 1955
1955 establishments in Turkey
Bridges in Diyarbakır